Henry Curran may refer to:

 Henry Curran (Australian politician) (1912–1975), member of the Legislative Assembly of Western Australia
 Henry M. Curran (1918–1993), American politician from New York
Henry H. Curran (Republican), 10th director of Ellis Island, from 1923 to 1926
 Henry Joseph Curran (1843–1882), Australian journalist
 Henry 'Babe' Curran (1896–1964), Australian woolgrower
 Harry Curran (born 1966), Scottish footballer